Young Sinners is a comedic play by Elmer Harris that first premiered at the Morosco Theatre in New York on November 28, 1929. The three act play was first revived at the New Yorker Theatre on April 20, 1931. It was then revived again at the Ambassador Theatre in New York on March 6, 1933. The cast changed during each revival, but Dorothy Appleby played Constance Sinclair in the original and the two revivals. The 1931 film Young Sinners is based on the play.

1933 cast
Maida Carrell as Madge Trowbridge
Paul Clare as Bud Springer
Virginia Lloyd as Betty Biddle
David Morris as Jimmy Stephens
John Bramhall as Butler
Dorothy Appleby as Constance Sinclair
Hilda Spong as Mrs. Sinclair
Alfred Hesse as Baron von Konitz
Jackson Halliday as Gene Gibson
Percy Moore as John Gibson
Arthur Bower as Trent
Ralph Sumpter as Manager of Apartment House
Dorothy Dianne as Alice Lewis
Frank Shannon as Tom Maguire
Paddy Reynolds as Maggie Maguire
Freddie Stange as Tim

References

1933 plays
Comedy plays
American plays adapted into films
Broadway plays